Penny Stamps Distinguished Speaker Series is a lecture series established by the University of Michigan School of Art & Design. With the support of Art and Design alumna Penny W. Stamps, the Penny Stamps Series presents visionary leaders who use their creative practice effectively. It celebrates those who transcend tradition and are progressive and influential with their work. Speakers are a range of emerging and established artists and designers from a broad spectrum of media, including painting, photography, architecture, sculpture and more.

Design professional, arts advocate, philanthropist, and friend Penny W. Stamps dedicated herself to elevating opportunities for the culture-makers of tomorrow. In 2012, the U-M Board of Regents named the School of Art & Design in her honor, creating the Penny W. Stamps School of Art & Design at the University of Michigan. The Stamps Gallery and Stamps Creative Work Awards are also named in her honor.

The Penny Stamps Series usually take place on Thursdays at 5:10 pm at the Michigan Theater, in downtown Ann Arbor. Due to the COVID-19 pandemic, the series has now moved online, and take place on Fridays at 8:00 pm. All lectures are free of charge and open to the public.

Most lectures are available via podcast on iTunes in both audio and video formats, as well as at the University of Michigan Stamps channel on YouTube.

Witt Visiting Artists
The Roman J. Witt Residency Program, developed with the support of alumna Penny W. Stamps and named in honor of her father, is an annual international competition that awards one residency per academic year to a visiting artist/designer who proposes to develop a new work in collaboration with students and faculty. The residency provides an opportunity for the Stamps community to witness and take part in the artist's creative process, and is expected to culminate in the realization of the proposed work, as well as a presentation that summarizes the process and work accomplished.

2021 Roman J. Witt Artist in Residence Program Update
Due to pandemic-related disruptions, all activities for the 2021 Roman J. Witt Artist in Residency program are postponed until 2022. Artist Tracey Snelling was originally named the 2021 Witt Artist in Residence; her residency will now take place in 2022. There will not be an application process for the 2022 Roman J. Witt Artist in Residence Program. Details about the 2023 program will be announced in November 2021.

Stamps Speakers

Partnerrs
The 2020-2021 Speaker Series is produced with help from DPTV.org and PBS Books.

References

External links
 Penny Stamps Distinguished Speaker Series home
 Audio podcast on iTunes
 Video podcast on iTunes
 Stamps playlist at PLAY
 Feature on Chrisstina Hamilton, Series director

Lecture series